The Reports on Sarah and Saleem is a 2018 international co-production drama film directed by Muayad Alayan.

References

External links 

2018 films
2018 drama films
2010s spy drama films
2010s English-language films
2010s Hebrew-language films
2010s Arabic-language films
Palestinian drama films
German drama films
Dutch drama films
Mexican drama films
Films set in Palestine (region)
Israeli–Palestinian conflict films
2018 multilingual films
2010s German films
2010s Mexican films